Moisés Arias (born April 18, 1994) is an American actor. He is best known for his roles as Rico in the Disney Channel series Hannah Montana, Biaggio in the 2013 Sundance film The Kings of Summer, Cokestraw in the 2019 SXSW comedy-drama The Wall of Mexico, and Bigfoot in the Colombian war drama Monos. He has also appeared in Pitch Perfect 3, Five Feet Apart, Ender's Game, The Stanford Prison Experiment, Jockey,  The Perfect Game and The King of Staten Island.

Early life
Moisés Arias was born April 18, 1994, in New York City, the son of Mónica and César Arias. His parents are Colombian, and he was raised bilingual. His brother is Kickin' It actor Mateo Arias. Before starting his acting career, Moises graduated from Barbizon Modeling and Acting School in Tampa, Florida.

Career
Moisés has made guest appearances on shows such as The Suite Life of Zack & Cody, Everybody Hates Chris and Wizards of Waverly Place. He had a recurring role as Rico on Hannah Montana, and became a series regular in the show's second season. In 2009, he played Andre in the Disney Channel Original Movie Dadnapped. As a regular on the Disney Channel, he participated on the first and second Disney Channel Games on the red team. He also participated in the third Disney Channel games on the Yellow Team (Comets). His main role while at Disney was as Rico Suave on Hannah Montana.
He appeared in music videos for Pearl Jam, the Jonas Brothers (for their song "SOS"), and Parmalee. Arias also appeared in the 2006 film Nacho Libre in a minor role. He participated in the 2009 Guadalajara Film Festival during the presentation of the movie The Perfect Game with Eva Longoria.

Arias appeared in Beethoven's Big Break in 2008. He appeared on the ESPN family of networks as a roving 'sideline' reporter conducting interviews with fans and players at the 2009 Little League World Series. He appeared in Wizards of Waverly Place and played Conscience, Max (Jake T. Austin)'s conscience.
Arias and his brother directed a series of YouTube films under the user name Moiswashere. In 2009, they worked on a film called Motocross Madness.

In mid-2012, Arias filmed The Kings of Summer, which had its premiere on January 19, 2013, at the 2013 Sundance Film Festival to positive reviews. That year, he appeared in the film Ender's Game, starring with Asa Butterfield, Abigail Breslin and Harrison Ford.
In 2012, Arias co-founded MSFTSrep, a youth collective and fashion brand alongside Jaden Smith, Willow Smith, and Mateo Arias. In late 2018, Arias released an album under a different alias.
In March 2019, Arias played Poe in the CBS film Five Feet Apart, starring with Cole Sprouse.
In January 2020, he appeared as a patient on an episode of The Good Doctor on the ABC network.

Filmography

Film

Television

Podcasts

Music videos

References

External links

 
 
 
 

1994 births
American people of Colombian descent
20th-century American male actors
21st-century American male actors
American male child actors
American male film actors
American male television actors
American male voice actors
Hispanic and Latino American male actors
Male actors from New York City
Living people